{{DISPLAYTITLE:C16H16O6}}
The molecular formula C16H16O6 (molar mass: 304.29 g/mol, exact mass: 304.094696 u) may refer to:

 Austrocortilutein
 Meciadanol
 Nigrosporin B
 Sappanol, a homoisoflavonoid

Molecular formulas